Santay Island (Spanish Isla Santay) is a 2200 ha. island located in Guayas, Ecuador. It is part of the Durán Canton. It is surrounded by the Guayas River and populated by 47 families living there since the 1950s and before. Santay has been declared a Ramsar site and the island is in the process of becoming a National Protected Area.

References

External links
Isla Santay 

Islands of Ecuador
Ecuador
Geography of Guayas Province
River islands